

The Cochise County Sheriff's Office (CCSO), headquartered in Bisbee, Arizona, is a local law enforcement agency that serves Cochise County, Arizona. It provides general-service law enforcement to unincorporated areas of Cochise County, serving as the equivalent of the police for unincorporated areas of the county. It also operates the county jail system. The Cochise County Sheriff's Office (CCSO) is sometimes referred to as the Cochise County Sheriff's Department (CCSD).

Sheriffs

See also 

 List of law enforcement agencies in Arizona
 The Sheriff of Cochise, 1956-1957 TV series about a fictional sheriff of Cochise County

References

External links
 Cochise County Sheriff's webpage

Sheriffs' offices of Arizona
Government of Cochise County, Arizona
1881 establishments in Arizona Territory